La Paloma-Lost Creek is a census-designated place (CDP) in Nueces County, Texas, United States. The population was 408 at the 2010 census, up from 323 at the 2000 census.

Geography
La Paloma-Lost Creek is located at  (27.717921, -97.741803).

Demographics
As of the census of 2000,  323 people, 76 households, and 65 families were residing in the CDP. The population density was 38.9 people/sq mi (15.0/km2). Its 92 housing units averaged 11.1/sq mi (4.3/km2). The racial makeup of the CDP was 67.18% White, 4.02% African American, 0.31% Asian, 22.60% from other races, and 5.88% from two or more races. Hispanics or Latinos of any race were 74.30% of the population.

Of the 76 households, 55.3% had children under 18 living with them, 73.7% were married couples living together, 5.3% had a female householder with no husband present, and 13.2% were not families. About 9.2% of all households were made up of individuals, and 3.9% had someone living alone who was 65 or older. The average household size was 3.88, and the average family size was 3.80.

In the CDP, the age distribution was 47.4% under 18, 8.0% from 18 to 24, 22.6% from 25 to 44, 17.6% from 45 to 64, and 4.3% who were 65  older. The median age was 19 years. For every 100 females, there were 121.2 males. For every 100 females age 18 and over, there were 102.4 males.

The median income for a household in the CDP was $37,708, and for a family was $39,167. Males had a median income of $40,833 versus $25,893 for females. The per capita income for the CDP was $9,955. About 22.2% of families and 34.7% of the population were below the poverty line, including 44.0% of those under age 18 and none of those age 65 or over.

Education
La Paloma-Lost Creek is served by, in separate sections, the Driscoll,  Robstown, Bishop Consolidated, and Banquete Independent School Districts.

References

Census-designated places in Nueces County, Texas
Census-designated places in Texas
Corpus Christi metropolitan area